Harvey Andrew Peltier Sr. (October 20, 1899 – November 12, 1977), was an attorney, banker, businessman, sugar grower, oilman, champion horse breeder, and politician from Thibodaux, Louisiana, who was a campaign manager of Governor and U.S. Senator Huey Pierce Long, Jr.

Political life

From 1924 to 1929, Peltier was a Democratic member of the Louisiana House of Representatives from his native Lafourche Parish. He was a state senator from Lafourche and Terrebonne parishes from 1930 to 1940.

During the 1960s, Peltier served on the since disbanded Louisiana State Board of Education as the elected member designated for Louisiana's 3rd congressional district. In the general election held on November 8, 1966, Peltier defeated for the state board a Republican candidate, businessman Charles deGravelles, a native of Morgan City residing in Lafayette who subsequently served from 1968 to 1972 as the state GOP party chairman. Peltier polled 44,413 votes (64.7 percent) to deGravelles' 24,236 votes (35.3 percent). In that same election Hall Lyons, a Lafayette oilman and the younger son of Louisiana Republican state chairman Charlton Lyons, failed to unseat veteran U.S. Representative Edwin E. Willis for the Third District House seat. Bill Dodd was then the education superintendent, a position now appointed by the governor, and the then 11-member state board was all-Democratic.

In September 1966, while running for the state education board, Peltier told an interviewer:

I'm 66 years young, and I guess I'm sort of a jack-of-all-trades. I mean I go to my office every day. I have a lot of things going for me. I may have less money than some people, but I have more nerve than most.

Family background

The eighth of nine children, Peltier was the son of a Cajun Roman Catholic couple, Ozeme Euzelien Peltier (1862-1933) and the former Heloise Odelia Cancienne (1864-1908). His mother died before his tenth birthday. Ozeme Peltier then married the former Celeste Marie Lenain (1872-1958), who had previously been married to Louis Oleus Gaubert.

Peltier and his wife, the former May Ayo (1902-1992), had four children. Harvey Peltier Jr., like his father, served in the Louisiana State Senate from the Lafourche/Terrebonne constituency. His tenure was from 1964 to 1976.  From 1975 to 1980, Peltier Jr., was the first president of the trustees of the University of Louisiana System, a successor education board of the one on which his father had served. The other Peltier children include Bernice P. Harang, James R. Peltier Sr. (1930-May 22, 2020), a Thibodaux oral surgeon, a founder and president of the Louisiana Society of Oral Surgeons, and member of the "good government" groups the Public Affairs Research Council and the Council for a Better Louisiana, Donald Louis Peltier (1926-2008), and Richard Benton Peltier (1938-2007). Peltier's son-in-law, Warren Harang, Jr. (1921-2005), was a former president of the Thibodaux Chamber of Commerce and the American Sugar Cane League, a member of the Lafourche Parish School Board, and the mayor of Thibodaux from 1968-1978, 1986-1990, and 1994-1998.

Peltier died in 1977 at the age of seventy-eight. He is interred in the family tomb at St. Joseph Cemetery in Thibodaux.

For his contribution to Thoroughbred racing, in 1994 Harvey Peltier was inducted into the Fair Grounds Racing Hall of Fame.

References

 

 

1899 births
1977 deaths
Louisiana lawyers
American bankers
Businesspeople from Louisiana
Farmers from Louisiana
Democratic Party Louisiana state senators
Democratic Party members of the Louisiana House of Representatives
People from Thibodaux, Louisiana
School board members in Louisiana
Cajun people
American racehorse owners and breeders
20th-century American politicians
Catholics from Louisiana
20th-century American businesspeople
20th-century American lawyers